Tyler Vlahovich (born 1967 in Tacoma, Washington, U.S.) is a contemporary artist living and working in Los Angeles, California. He attended California Institute of the Arts in 1988 and 1989.

Vlahovich works in a variety of media that includes painting, drawing and sculpture.

He is a member of WPA, which is an artist-run gallery in Los Angeles. Vlahovich is also a member of Artists Pension Trust Los Angeles.

Vlahovich has exhibited at various other galleries and museums such as Leo Koenig Gallery, New York; ACME, Los Angeles; Anton Kern Gallery, New York; Cherry & Martin, Los Angeles, Torrance Art Museum, Torrance, CA; David Patton Gallery, Los Angeles; The Happy Lion, Los Angeles; Mary Goldman Gallery, Los Angeles; Stalke Gallery, Copenhagen; Lemon Sky Projects, Miami; SEAD Gallery, Antwerp; Royal Academy of Art, London; Atelier Cardenas Bellanger, Paris; Fullerton Art Museum, San Bernardino, CA; Institute of Contemporary Arts, London.

External links
 Tyler Vlahovich
 WPA

20th-century American painters
American male painters
21st-century American painters
American contemporary painters
Art in Greater Los Angeles
Living people
1967 births
20th-century American male artists